Aleksa Palladino (born ) is an American actress and singer, perhaps best known for her lead roles in Manny & Lo, The Adventures of Sebastian Cole, Find Me Guilty, Angela Darmody in the HBO crime series Boardwalk Empire (2010–2011), Mara in Wrong Turn 2: Dead End (2007), Before the Devil Knows You're Dead (2007), The Midnight Swim (2014), Mary Sheeran in The Irishman (2019), and No Man of God (2021). She also played a main role in the second season of the AMC period drama Halt and Catch Fire. From 2007 to 2018, she was one half of the dreampop duo Exitmusic with former husband Devon Church, releasing the albums The Decline of the West (2007), Passage (2012), and The Recognitions (2018).

Life and acting career 
Aleksa Federici Palladino was born in New York City, where she grew up and worked as an actress. She is the only child of filmmaker, soprano singer, photographer, graphic artist, and producer  Sabrina A. Palladino, and the granddaughter of Sicilian painter and sculptor Angela Fodale Palladino and the Italian-American illustrator and graphic designer Anthony Americo "Tony" Palladino, who designed the lettering for Robert Bloch's 1959 novel Psycho. An episode of The Marvelous Mrs. Maisel, created by Amy Sherman-Palladino, is dedicated to Tony. Palladino's aunt, Kate Palladino-Kirk, is a designer, her great-great-uncle Rocco Fodale was a painter from Trapani, and her great-uncle Tonino Fodale worked as a retoucher for the biggest fashion photographers, such as Richard Avedon and Peter Lindbergh. Palladino's ancestral origins are in Naples and Sicily.

Her debut role was as "Lo" in Manny & Lo opposite Scarlett Johansson and Mary Kay Place, in which she played a 16-year-old character despite being 14 at the time. The next year, she was given her first lead role in the short film Number One Fan with Glenn Fitzgerald, and soon appeared in Wrestling with Alligators with Joely Richardson, the well-received The Adventures of Sebastian Cole with Adrian Grenier, and Second Skin with Fitzgerald again.

The year 2000 saw the release of Red Dirt, followed by the independent film Lonesome, and  Storytelling with Selma Blair. She then had guest appearances in Law & Order: Criminal Intent (where she played two different characters), The Sopranos and Law & Order.

In 2004, Palladino returned to acting with a guest appearance on Medium, followed by her lead role in Spectropia and a supporting one in Find Me Guilty with Vin Diesel. After she worked in Find Me Guilty, director Sidney Lumet offered Palladino the role of Chris Lasorda in Before the Devil Knows You're Dead. She then appeared in The Picture of Dorian Gray, based on the novel by Oscar Wilde, and landed a supporting role in the acclaimed horror sequel Wrong Turn 2: Dead End.

The 2010s saw her busy mainly on television; her role as Prohibition-era gangster Jimmy Darmody's closeted wife Angela in the HBO series Boardwalk Empire stands out. She was also a series regular of season two in the critically acclaimed AMC series Halt and Catch Fire as Sara Wheeler. Her next important film role was Mary Sheeran in Martin Scorsese's The Irishman, which was distributed by Netflix and received only a limited theatrical release.

Musical career and personal life 

For over ten years she was the lead singer and songwriter of the band Exitmusic, which she formed with her husband Devon Church. After a self-released album in 2007, the band released an EP in 2011 and a full-length album in 2012 for the indie label Secretly Canadian. A final album followed in 2018 for Felte Records.

Palladino met Church in 2001 while on a cross Canada train trip. They married on September 30, 2004, before separating in 2013. Their divorce was finalized in 2015. They had no children together.

Discography 
with Duo Exitmusic
 The Decline of the West (self-released, 2007)
 From Silence (EP) (Secretly Canadian, 2011)
 Passage (Secretly Canadian, 2012)
 The Recognitions (Felte, 2018)

Filmography

Film

Television

References

External links 

 
 Band MySpace

Living people
20th-century American actresses
20th-century American singers
21st-century American actresses
21st-century American singers
Actresses from New York City
American people of Italian descent
American child actresses
American women singer-songwriters
American film actresses
American television actresses
Singers from New York City
Singer-songwriters from New York (state)
20th-century American women singers
21st-century American women singers
Secretly Canadian artists
Year of birth missing (living people)